Michael Pattinson (born 1957) is an Australian film director. He has directed over 40 films and television shows since 1980. In 1987, along with Bruce Myles, he co-directed the film Ground Zero. It was entered into the 38th Berlin International Film Festival.

Selected filmography
 The Young Doctors (1980)
 Prisoner (1980)
 Moving Out (1983)
 Street Hero (1984)
 Ground Zero (1987)
 Wendy Cracked a Walnut (1990)
 The Last Bullet (1995)
 Virtual Nightmare (2000)

References

External links

1957 births
Living people
Film directors from Melbourne